Campiglossa trinotata is a species of tephritid or fruit flies in the genus Campiglossa of the family Tephritidae.

Distribution
The species is found in Guatemala.

References

Tephritinae
Insects described in 1979
Diptera of South America